The 1982 NCAA Women's Division II Swimming and Diving Championships were the first annual NCAA-sanctioned swim meet to determine the team and individual national champions of Division II women's collegiate swimming and diving in the United States. 

The inaugural event was hosted by Clarion University in Clarion, Pennsylvania.

Cal State Northridge topped the team standings and took home the inaugural Division II women's team title.

Team standings
Note: Top 10 only
Full results

See also
List of college swimming and diving teams

References

NCAA Division II Swimming And Diving Championships
NCAA Division II Swimming And Diving Championships
NCAA Division II championships